Commonwealth Sport Canada (CSC), formerly Commonwealth Games Canada (CGC), is the Commonwealth Games Association of Canada responsible for Commonwealth Games and the Commonwealth Sports movement in Canada.

Board of directors
Board of directors are elected for a quadrennial term.

New Brand 
On 10 March 2020, during Commonwealth Day, the association launched its new brand. In addition to the new name, CSC has also introduced its new CSC logo which links to the new CGF brand by incorporating the three "Victory Marks".

Commonwealth Games Foundation of Canada
The Commonwealth Games Foundation of Canada (CGFC) is a body within CSC, established in 1982 with an aim to raise the funds required to send the Canadian delegation—athletes and officials—to the Commonwealth Games. Former president of the Hudson's Bay Company George Heller is the incumbent president of the CGFC, who was also the president and CEO of the 1994 Commonwealth Games Organising Committee.

See also
Canada at the Commonwealth Games
Canadian Olympic Committee

References

Canada

Sports governing bodies in Canada